Nexans S.A. is a global company in the cable and optical fiber industry headquartered in Paris, France.

The group is active in four main business areas: buildings and territories (construction, local infrastructure, smart cities / grids, e-mobility), high voltage and projects (offshore wind farms, subsea interconnections, land high voltage), data and telecoms (telecom networks, data transmission, FTTx, LAN cabling, renewable energies, petroleum, railways and rolling stock, aeronautical and automation.

It is the world's second largest manufacturer of cables after Prysmian S.p.A. In 2017, the Group had industrial presence in 34 countries with over 26,000 employees and sales of around €6.4 billion. Nexans was founded in 2000 as a business unit of the telecommunications firm Alcatel after its acquisition of a number of companies in the cable sector. It was spun out and listed on the Paris stock exchange the following year. It is currently listed on Euronext Paris, Compartment A. Nexans will supply and install HVDC cables for EuroAsia Interconnector, the longest and the deepest HVDC subsea cable project ever, with bi-pole cables of 2x900km.

History 

 1897 - Foundation of la Société Française des Câbles Électriques, Système Berthoud, Borel et Cie. 
 1912 - Acquisition of the company by Alcatel. 
 1917 - The company is renamed Compagnie générale des câbles de Lyon.
 1986 - Câbles de Lyon becomes Alcatel Câbles.
 1996 - Alcatel Câbles merges with Alcatel.
 2000 - Alcatel Câbles and Components become Nexans.
 2001 - Nexans is listed on Paris Stock Exchange.
 2008 - Nexans acquires Madeco, in the cable industry in South America.
 2012 - Nexans acquires AmerCable, an American company specialized in power cables based in El Dorado, Arkansas for 275 million dollars. The group also acquires a Chinese company Shandong Yanggu Cable Group.
 2019 - Nexans shuts down the Hanover factory - it continues operation into 2020
 2020 - Nexans shuts down the Chester NY factory and exits the US building wire market 
2021 - a new facility was launched in China.

References

External links

 

Manufacturing companies based in Paris
Networking hardware companies
Wire and cable manufacturers
Multinational companies headquartered in France
Electronics companies established in 2000
French brands
French companies established in 2000
2001 initial public offerings
Alcatel-Lucent
Corporate spin-offs
Companies listed on Euronext Paris